Waleed Abdullah Ali Al-Dawsari (born April 19, 1986) is a Saudi Arabian footballer who currently plays as a goalkeeper for Al-Nassr.

A former regular for Saudi Arabia at Under-23 level, Abdullah made his senior international debut in July 2007, and was recognized as Saudi Arabia's first-choice goalkeeper from 2008 to 2014. He has gained 72 caps and was selected in Saudi Arabia's squads for four AFC Asian Cups.

Club career
Waleed Abdullah began playing on a regular basis with Al-Shabab in the 2007–08 season. In the 2006–07 season, he was with the Saudi Olympic team in their qualifiers, so he had no chance of playing with Al-Shabab as their first goalkeeper.

On 3 February 2017, Abdullah joined Al-Nassr on a free transfer. On 4 February 2020, he renewed his contract with Al-Nassr for another three years.

International career

Olympic Team
Waleed Abdullah played 11 games with the Olympic team during the 2008 Qualifiers, in which he helped the team reach the second round, and was close to qualifying had they won against Japan in Tokyo in the last game. Waleed's best game was against Japan in Tokyo, where he stopped many Japanese attacks and stopped the Japanese from scoring.

Senior Team
Waleed first joined the Saudi Arabia national football team for the AFC Asian Cup 2007. His first official game was a friendly against United Arab Emirates in June 2007, which ended 2-0 for Saudi Arabia. He also played another friendly against Oman, and it ended 1-1. Right before the beginning of the Asian Cup, Waleed received news of the death of his infant daughter. But he decided to stay with the national team, and was one of the players in Saudi Arabia's squad in the Asian Cup, but didn't get any playtime during the cup itself.

After the Asian Cup he was called up a couple of times, for a friendly against Ghana which ended 5-0 for Saudi Arabia, and the 2010 World Cup Qualifiers against Singapore which ended 2-0, and for the Uzbekistan qualifier on 26 March 2008.

Career statistics

Club
As of 31 December 2022.

International
Statistics accurate as of match played 28 February 2018.

Honours

Club
Al-Shabab
 Saudi Professional League: 2011–12
 King Cup: 2008, 2009, 2014
 Saudi Super Cup: 2014
 Federation Cup: 2008–09, 2009–10

Al-Nassr
 Saudi Professional League: 2018–19
 Saudi Super Cup: 2019, 2020

References

External links

Living people
1986 births
Saudi Arabian footballers
Saudi Arabia youth international footballers
Saudi Arabia international footballers
Association football goalkeepers
Sportspeople from Riyadh
Al-Shabab FC (Riyadh) players
Al Nassr FC players
2007 AFC Asian Cup players
2011 AFC Asian Cup players
2015 AFC Asian Cup players
2019 AFC Asian Cup players
Saudi Professional League players